Mitiwanga is an unincorporated community and census-designated place in Erie County, Ohio, United States. It is located within Berlin and Vermilion townships, on the south shore of Lake Erie. U.S. Route 6 passes through the community, leading northeast  to Vermilion and west  to Huron.

Demographics

References

Geography of Erie County, Ohio
Census-designated places in Ohio
Ohio populated places on Lake Erie
Census-designated places in Erie County, Ohio